Jorge Iván Pérez (born 23 May 1990 in Tandil, Buenos Aires) is an Argentine footballer who played as a midfielder. His career finished in June 2021 after an ACL injury.

Career
Pérez did all his training at Independiente's youth academy. His first professional game was a 2-0 loss against Rosario Central in 2008 when he was only 17 years old of age.
He was part of the winning squad that won the Copa Sudamericana 2010.

On April 8, 2011 he scored his first career goal in a 3-0 win against Godoy Cruz Antonio Tomba. 
In the 2011 Apertura he scored 2 great goals, one was against All Boys, hitting the ball from outside the box and another goal to Olimpo de Bahia Blanca on a 3 -0 win.

Honours

References

External links
Jorge Iván Pérez at Soccerway

1990 births
People from Tandil
Living people
Argentine footballers
Argentine expatriate footballers
Association football midfielders
Argentine Primera División players
Primera B Metropolitana players
Primera Nacional players
Liga Portugal 2 players
Club Atlético Independiente footballers
Club Atlético Banfield footballers
San Martín de San Juan footballers
S.C. Freamunde players
Aldosivi footballers
Cibao FC players
Club y Biblioteca Ramón Santamarina footballers
Argentine expatriate sportspeople in Portugal
Expatriate footballers in Portugal
Expatriate footballers in the Dominican Republic
Sportspeople from Buenos Aires Province